La Crosse Boiling Water Reactor (LACBWR) is a retired Boiling Water Reactor (BWR) nuclear power plant located near La Crosse, Wisconsin in the small village of Genoa, in Vernon County, Wisconsin, approximately 17 miles south of La Crosse along the Mississippi River. It was located directly adjacent to the coal-fired Genoa Generating Station. The site is owned and was operated by the Dairyland Power Cooperative (DPC).

LACBWR was built from 1963 to 1967 as part of a federal project to demonstrate the viability of peacetime nuclear power.  It was designed and built by Allis-Chalmers and funded in part by the Atomic Energy Commission (AEC) in cooperation with Dairyland Power Cooperative. The reactor began commercial operation in 1969 and reached full capacity in 1971.  LACBWR had a 50 MW electrical output from a forced-circulation, direct-cycle boiling water reactor as its heat source. In 1973 the reactor and fuel were transferred in full to Dairyland Power.

Decommissioning and Waste Disposal

In April 1987, LACBWR was shut down because the small size of the plant made it no longer economically viable.  It was placed in SAFSTOR August 7, 1991.  The reactor pressure vessel was removed in May 2007 and shipped to Chem-Nuclear's Barnwell, South Carolina Low-Level Radioactive Waste (LLRW) disposal facility. The shipment weighed approximately 310 tons and required a specially designed rail car.

In 2012, spent nuclear fuel from the reactor was sealed into a dry cask storage installation located immediately south of the Genoa Generating Station. Spent reactor fuel continues to be stored on site pending the creation of a national radioactive waste disposal facility such as Yucca Mountain.

In 2016, Dairyland Power transferred control of the inactive reactor facility to LaCrosseSolutions, a subsidiary of Utah-based EnergySolutions, for the purpose of demolition and decommissioning.

In February 2017, workers spilled about 400 gallons of radioactive wastewater into the Mississippi River after leaving a hose and sump pump in a tank overnight. The wastewater contained Caesium-137 at concentrations greater than allowed under federal regulation for discharge; however, the resulting radiation was below levels considered harmful to human health. In another incident, routine tests from December 2017 to August 2018 detected elevated levels of tritium in groundwater at the site. The tritium was traced to condensation around a vent installed during demolition of the facility and the leak was mitigated before spreading to the Mississippi River.

In 2019, EnergySolutions announced that it had completed the physical demolition of the reactor. The company has subsequently applied for extensions to December 2022 to provide the Nuclear Regulatory Commission with sufficient survey data to proceed with the full decommissioning of the site, excluding spent fuel storage.

References

External links

NukeWorker
Dairyland Power Cooperative LACBWR page

Energy infrastructure completed in 1973
Buildings and structures in Vernon County, Wisconsin
Former nuclear power stations in the United States
Nuclear power plants in Wisconsin
Former power stations in Wisconsin